Zale edusina is a species of moth in the family Erebidae. It is found in North America.

The MONA or Hodges number for Zale edusina is 8693.

References

Further reading

 
 
 

Omopterini
Articles created by Qbugbot
Moths described in 1875